Doc Savage made it to the radio three times: 1934–35, 1943 and 1985. The 1934–35 episodes were 15 minutes each and were written by Lester Dent. Episodes 27–52 were repeats of the 1934 episodes. The 1943 episodes were 30 minutes long. Episodes 76–78 were repeats of selected 1943 episodes.   All the scripts were credited to Lester Dent; no recordings of any episode, nor records of cast or crew exist.

The 1985 National Public Radio episodes were 30 minutes each. They were two series, Fear Cay (Episodes 79–85) and The Thousand-Headed Man (Episodes 86–91).

References

External links
 Originally aired in 1985, "The Adventures of Doc Savage" is copyrighted by Roger Rittner Productions. In October 2010, Rittner authorized the first commercial release of the series through Radio Archives, complete with a "making-of" documentary and liner notes by "Doc Savage" author Will Murray.

 
Lists of radio series episodes